Emil Steen may refer to:

 Emil Steen (1829–1884), Norwegian ship-owner and businessperson
 Emil Steen (1887–1950), Norwegian businessperson
 Emil Steen (1870–1915), Norwegian businessperson